"I'm Cryin'" is a song by American singer-songwriter Shanice, released in February 1992 as the second single from her second album, Inner Child (1991). It was the follow-up to her highly successful single "I Love Your Smile", and it peaked at number 11 on the US Billboard Hot R&B/Hip-Hop Songs chart. A music video was also produced to promote the single.

Critical reception
Larry Flick from Billboard wrote, "Pop/urban ingenue follows the giddy "I Love Your Smile" with a mature and sensitive ballad. Grand production by Walden inspires a powerful vocal performance, which should help build momentum at several radio formats." Michael Eric Dyson from Rolling Stone described the song as "a piercing lamentation of lost love, [that] slowly builds to a wailing climax."

Track listing
 CD single
Radio Edit (3:46)
Full Version (5:03)
Instrumental (5:02)

Charts

Notes and references

1992 singles
Shanice songs
Songs written by Narada Michael Walden
Song recordings produced by Narada Michael Walden
1991 songs
Motown singles
Songs written by Shanice
Songs written by Sally Jo Dakota